Swift Rivers is a children's historical novel by Cornelia Meigs. Set initially in 1835 in Minnesota, it is a story of the early days of the logging industry, when logs were floated down the Mississippi to St. Louis. The novel, illustrated by Forrest W. Orr, was first published in 1931 and was a Newbery Honor recipient in 1933.

References

1931 American novels
Children's historical novels
American children's novels
Newbery Honor-winning works
Novels set in Minnesota
Fiction set in 1835
Novels set in the 1830s
1931 children's books